Water level, also known as gauge height or stage, is the elevation of the free surface of a sea, stream, lake or reservoir relative to a specified vertical datum.

See also 
 Water level (device), device utilizing the surface of liquid water to establish a local horizontal plane of reference
 Flood stage
 Hydraulic head
 Stream gauge
 Water level gauges
 Tide gauge
 Level sensor
 Liquid level
 Stage (hydrology)
 Sea level

References 

Hydrology
Vertical position